John Brown's Body (1928) is an epic American poem written by Stephen Vincent Benét.  Its title references the radical abolitionist John Brown, who raided the federal armory at Harpers Ferry, Virginia in October 1859.  He was captured and hanged later that year. Benét's poem covers the history of the American Civil War. It won the Pulitzer Prize for Poetry in 1929. It was written while Benét lived in Paris after receiving a Guggenheim Fellowship in 1926.

The poem was performed on Broadway in 1953 in a staged dramatic reading starring Tyrone Power, Judith Anderson, and Raymond Massey, and directed by Charles Laughton. In 2015 the recorded performance was selected for inclusion in the Library of Congress's National Recording Registry for the recording's "cultural, artistic and/or historical significance to American society and the nation’s audio legacy".

In 2002, the poem, transformed into a play, was performed in San Quentin State Prison by prisoners. The 2013 documentary film John Brown's Body at San Quentin Prison recounts the story of the production of the play.

References

External links
Benét, Stephen Vincent.  1928.  John Brown's Body. Chicago: Elephant Paperback.
Google Reader 
Amazon 
Oates, Stephen B.  1984.  To Purge This Land With Blood: A Biography of John Brown.  Boston: University of Massachusetts Press. Google Reader  
West Virginia Archives and History 
John J. Miller, "'John Brown's Body' Exhumed," Wall Street Journal, October 15, 2009
Project Gutenberg: John Brown's Body (1928) (full text)

1928 poems
Epic poems in English
Pulitzer Prize for Poetry-winning works
1928 books
Cultural depictions of John Brown (abolitionist)
John Brown's raid on Harpers Ferry